Djakaridja Koné (born 22 July 1986) is a Burkinabé former professional footballer who played as a defensive midfielder.

Career
Born in Abidjan, Ivory Coast, Koné started his career in Israel with Hapoel Petah Tikva, making his senior debuts in the 2005–06 campaign. In the 2006 summer he was loaned to Hapoel Haifa, appearing regularly for the side during his two-year spell.

On 18 July 2009 Koné moved to Romania, signing a three-year contract with Dinamo București. Initially a backup to Ousmane N'Doye, he was made a starter after the Senegalese's departure to Astra Ploiești in January 2011.

Koné was an ever-present figure for Dinamo afterwards, being named Man of the match in a 1–0 2012 Cupa României Final win against Rapid București on 23 May 2012.  Shortly after he was linked to Olympique de Marseille, but nothing came of it.

On 20 July 2012, after refusing to sign a new deal, Koné switched teams and countries again, after agreeing to a three-year contract with Ligue 1 side Evian. He made his debut in the category on 24 August, coming on as a late substitute for Cédric Barbosa in a 1–1 home draw against Lyon.

Koné scored his first goal in the main category of French football on 27 September 2014, netting the first in a 2–0 away win against Lorient.

International career
After representing Ivory Coast at under-17 and under-19 levels, Koné was subsequently eligible to Burkina Faso. He made his debut for the latter's main squad on 9 February 2011, in a 0–1 loss against Cape Verde.

Koné was called up to the 2012, 2013 and 2015 Africa Cup of Nations. He scored his first goal for the side on 25 January 2013, netting the third in a 4–0 home win against Ethiopia.

International goals

Honours

Club
Dinamo București
Romanian Cup: 2011–12

Notes

External links

Imgscouting profile

1986 births
Living people
Footballers from Abidjan
Citizens of Burkina Faso through descent
Burkinabé footballers
Burkina Faso international footballers
Ivorian footballers
Ivory Coast under-20 international footballers
Ivorian people of Burkinabé descent
Sportspeople of Burkinabé descent
Association football midfielders
Hapoel Petah Tikva F.C. players
Hapoel Haifa F.C. players
Liga I players
FC Dinamo București players
Ligue 1 players
Thonon Evian Grand Genève F.C. players
2012 Africa Cup of Nations players
2013 Africa Cup of Nations players
2015 Africa Cup of Nations players
Ivorian expatriate footballers
Burkinabé expatriate footballers
Ivorian expatriate sportspeople in Israel
Burkinabé expatriate sportspeople in Israel
Expatriate footballers in Israel
Ivorian expatriate sportspeople in Romania
Burkinabé expatriate sportspeople in Romania
Expatriate footballers in Romania
Ivorian expatriate sportspeople in France
Burkinabé expatriate sportspeople in France
Expatriate footballers in France
Ivorian expatriate sportspeople in Turkey
Burkinabé expatriate sportspeople in Turkey
Expatriate footballers in Turkey
21st-century Burkinabé people